Entwicklung und Erprobung von Leichtflugzeugen (EEL) is a German aircraft design firm based in Putzbrunn. The company was founded in 1976 by Heiner Neumann and Dieter Reich. It specializes in the design of gliders and motor gliders, provided in the form of plans for amateur construction.

History
Both Neumann and Reich studied aeronautics in the early 1960s while at the Technical University of Berlin. Reich designed the two aircraft marketed by EEL.

The EEL ULF 1, a foot-launched microlift glider that weighs  empty, first flew in November 1977. The EEL ULF 2 is a single-seat motorglider that first flew in October 1993. As a result of his design work on the ULF 2 Reich received the Oskar Ursinus Vereinigung (OUV) Hans-Becker-Prize in June 1997.

Aircraft

See also
 List of gliders

References

External links

 ulf-2.com - Seite des Entwicklers

Aircraft manufacturers of Germany
Ultralight aircraft
Homebuilt aircraft